Atlantic City International Airport  is a shared civil-military airport  northwest of Atlantic City, New Jersey, in Egg Harbor Township, the Pomona section of Galloway Township and in Hamilton Township. The airport is accessible via Exit 9 on the Atlantic City Expressway.  The facility is operated by the South Jersey Transportation Authority (SJTA) and the Port Authority of New York and New Jersey, which performs select management functions. Most of the land is owned by the Federal Aviation Administration and leased to the SJTA, while the SJTA owns the terminal building.

The facility also is a base for the New Jersey Air National Guard's 177th Fighter Wing operating the F-16C/D Fighting Falcon, and the United States Coast Guard's Coast Guard Air Station Atlantic City operating the Eurocopter HH-65 Dolphin. The airport is next to the FAA's William J. Hughes Technical Center, a major research and testing hub for the Federal Aviation Administration and a training center for the Federal Air Marshal Service. It was also a designated alternative landing site for the Space Shuttle.

The airport is served by Spirit Airlines which operates Airbus A319, Airbus A320 and Airbus A321 jetliners. Additionally, Caesars Entertainment has flights to cities east of the Mississippi River on its Total Rewards Air. This is offered as a scheduled charter year-round. United Airlines operated a series of flights starting in April 2014, but decided the flights were not viable and discontinued service on December 3, 2014.

The South Jersey Transportation Authority has outlined plans for massive terminal expansions (on top of current initiatives) which might be needed if more airlines serve the airport. Passenger traffic at the airport in 2011 was 1,404,119, making it the 102nd busiest airport in the country. The SJTA owns a small area around the terminal and leases runways and other land from the FAA.

History

Its purpose was to train various carrier air groups consisting of fighter, bomber and torpedo squadrons.

In August 1943, NAS Atlantic City changed its mission to strictly fighter training, consisting of low and high altitude gunnery tactics, field carrier landing practice (FCLP), carrier qualifications (CQ), bombing, formation tactics, fighter direction, night operations and an associated ground school curriculum.

NAS Atlantic City was decommissioned in June 1958 and transferred to the Airways Modernization Board (AMB), later taken over by the FAA. In November 1958 the then-Federal Aviation Agency, now Federal Aviation Administration (FAA), took over operations of the AMB. The lease transferred to the FAA and was sold for $55,000. Atlantic City decided to retain 84 of the 4,312 acres. The South Jersey Transportation Authority (SJTA) initially leased portions of the airport from the FAA and now serves as the airport owner and operator of the facility.

When the Navy departed in 1958, the 119th Fighter Squadron of the New Jersey Air National Guard relocated to Atlantic City from their former base at Newark International Airport with their F-84F Thunderstreak aircraft, establishing an Air National Guard base on the site of the former naval air station. The current 177th Fighter Wing of the New Jersey Air National Guard has been at this location ever since.

During the 1960s and early 1970s, the active duty U.S. Air Force's 95th Fighter Interceptor Squadron, stationed at Dover AFB, Delaware, maintained an Operating Location and Alert Detachment of F-106 Delta Darts at Atlantic City ANGB on 24-hour alert. After the 177th Fighter Wing reequipped with the F-106 in 1973, the 177th took on the air defence alert mission.

In the fall of 1983, American International Airways attempted to operate a small hub at the airport with Douglas DC-9-30 jetliners with passenger service to Boston, Buffalo, Chicago, Cleveland, Detroit, Fort Lauderdale, Miami, Orlando, Pittsburgh, Tampa and West Palm Beach. ACY has also had US Airways jet service to Pittsburgh as well as US Airways Express turboprops to Philadelphia, Baltimore and Washington, and Continental Express turboprops and regional jets to Cleveland Hopkins International Airport. This regional jet service for Continental Airlines was operated by ExpressJet Airlines with Embraer ERJs.

Delta Air Lines also had flights to Boston on Delta Connection regional jets operated by Atlantic Coast Airlines until a few years ago. In addition, Delta Connection via its partner Comair operated flights to Cincinnati and Orlando, which ended on May 1, 2007.  WestJet had Boeing 737 jetliner flights from ACY to Toronto, but ended them on May 9, 2010, leaving the airport with no international service. On April 1, 2014, United Airlines started service from Atlantic City to Chicago–O'Hare and Houston, but the service was discontinued on December 3, 2014. Air Canada had seasonal flights to Toronto in the Summer of 2015, but has decided not to return in the Summer of 2016, once again leaving the airport without international scheduled flights. Spirit is currently the sole tenant at the airport.

Early in 2022, American Airlines announced they would start bus service from the airport to their airplanes hub located at Philadelphia International Airport. The bus service will be carried by American's bus service partner, Landline.

Atlantic City Air National Guard Base

Since 1958, the airport has been home to Atlantic City Air National Guard Base and the 177th Fighter Wing (177 FW), an Air Combat Command (ACC)-gained unit of the New Jersey Air National Guard, operating the F-16C/D Fighting Falcon. Since October 1998, the wing has had an active involvement in Operation Noble Eagle, Operation Southern Watch, Operation Northern Watch, Operation Enduring Freedom and Operation Iraqi Freedom. As an Air National Guard unit, the 177 FW has dual federal (USAF augmentation) and state (support to New Jersey) missions.

Coast Guard Air Station Atlantic City

ACY is also home to Coast Guard Air Station Atlantic City. CGAS Atlantic City was opened on May 18, 1998, and is the newest and largest single airframe unit and facility of the Coast Guard's air stations. It is a product of the merging of the former CGAS Brooklyn/Floyd Bennett Field, NY and Group Air Station Cape May, NJ into one unit. CGAS Atlantic City consists of 10 HH-65C Dolphin helicopters and it maintains two Dolphin helicopters in 30-minute response status. Approximately, 250 aviation personnel comprise the facility's full-time staff, augmented by additional part-time Coast Guard Reserve and Coast Guard Auxiliary personnel. CGAS Atlantic City also provides aircrews and aircraft to the Washington, D.C., area as part of Operation Noble Eagle, the Department of Defense USNORTHCOM / NORAD mission to protect U.S. airspace and, in this case, specifically around the nation's capital.

Facilities

It has two runways: 4/22 is 6,144 by 150 feet (1,873 x 46 m) asphalt/concrete; 13/31 is 10,000 by 150 feet (3,048 x 46 m) asphalt.

Terminal
Atlantic City International Airport has one terminal. Several charter carriers operate out of the terminal, along with scheduled flights of Spirit Airlines. The terminal has a small layout, making it an alternative to Philadelphia International Airport or Newark Liberty International Airport.

Passengers enter the terminal on the lower-level which has the check-in counters, a small grill and a gift shop. Baggage claim is on this level, with three carousels. After check-in, passengers proceed to the security checkpoint, also on this level. After the security checkpoint, stairs and escalators lead to the departures level. The 10 gates are here, with several open for use by charters and several used by the scheduled carriers. All gates are uniform, with no customization by the airlines. Also on the second level are a café, a bar and a newsstand.

Free Wi-Fi is available throughout the terminal.

Parking
Atlantic City International Airport has a six-story parking garage with a covered walkway within steps to the terminal building. Surface parking is within walking distance and shuttle service is provided from the economy parking area to the terminal building.

The parking garage has rental car facilities for Enterprise, Hertz, Avis and Budget.

Ground transportation
Taxi service is available at curbside and a shuttle service is provided by the Atlantic City Jitney Association, located in the airport terminal, outside of baggage claim. A shuttle bus brings passengers to the Egg Harbor City rail station, which provides service to the Atlantic City Line, which runs between the 30th Street Station in Philadelphia to the Atlantic City Rail Terminal. Shuttles to the Egg Harbor rail station connect to shuttles to the visitor's center at the FAA Technical Center and the Stockton University, as well as bus lines to the PATCO Speedline at the Lindenwold station.

Restaurants and lounges
Dunkin’/Hudson News
American Bagel Co. (1st and 2nd floor)
Beach House Restaurant

Current construction projects
The South Jersey Transportation Authority will begin construction of a new aircraft rescue and firefighting station at Atlantic City International Airport. The new 45,000 square foot building will feature vehicle bays, administrative and staff living areas, enhanced equipment and apparatus facilities as well as room for training requirements.

Work began in August 2011 upgrading the passenger screening facilities at airport. The checkpoint expansion will consist of the addition of three new screening lanes as well as improvements to the airport's infrastructure. The TSA will supply the new screening equipment for the expanded area. The expansion also includes development of a Federal Inspection Services station. Under this project, equipment will include additional passenger loading bridges and gates, new technological upgrades, baggage carousel improvements, added retail space and improved check-in capabilities.

Possible future construction projects
A bill has been submitted in the New Jersey legislature that would provide for a rail station at the airport that would become a part of NJ Transit's Atlantic City Line. No specific funding or budget has been drawn up, but estimates for the project are in the range of $25 million to $30 million.

Federal facilities
The Federal Aviation Administration William J. Hughes Technical Center is on the property of Atlantic City Airport.

Airlines and destinations

In 2017 the airport had 53,506 aircraft operations, an average of 147 per day: 41% military, 15% scheduled commercial, 35% general aviation and 9% air taxi. 46 aircraft were then based at this airport: 24% single-engine, 4% jet, 24% helicopter and 48% military.

Statistics

Top destinations

Annual traffic

Plans

NextGen Technical Park
A technology park housing Next Generation Air Transportation System is currently under construction on the airport property on a  lot near Amelia Earhart Boulevard and Delilah Road. The seven-building complex is set to contain  of offices, laboratories and research facilities. The park will focus on developing new computer equipment that will transform the country's air-traffic control program into a satellite-based system. The first of the buildings was originally set to open in April 2012 and will contain a lab for the FAA as well as research space for other tenants.

A second office park, the NextGen International Aviation Center for Excellence, is set to be built in nearby Hamilton Township, adjacent to the Hamilton Mall and Atlantic City Race Course, the latter of which is set to be renovated. A new transportation center at the site would transfer workers between the two complexes.

Hotel and conference center
In 2009, the SJTA awarded a contract to a Ventnor City-based construction firm to construct a hotel on a  property leased from the FAA at the intersection of Tilton and Delilah Roads. The hotel would be built to accommodate a new flood of business travelers brought by the NextGen technical park.

Atlantic City Expressway connector
The SJTA revealed plans for a major road improvement project that would link the airport directly to the Atlantic City Expressway, with construction beginning in 2013. The plan includes new ramps with two overpasses over the expressway. The road would connect Amelia Earhart Boulevard with a bridge over Airport Circle. Plans also call for building a service road with another overpass that would provide access to Delilah Road. Another project involves the installation of an overpass at the end of Amelia Earhart Boulevard next to the entrance to the FAA tech center. The proposed roadway would intrude upon a small section of a mobile home park and land owned by Egg Harbor Township. The project was delayed due to a lack of financing. The 2018 Statewide Transportation Improvement Program included the direct connector, with an estimated cost of $60 million, to be built from 2019 to 2020.

Port Authority takeover
In February 2011, the New Jersey Legislature authorized the Atlantic City Tourism District, which would promote continued development of tourism in the region. A provision included the potential transfer of operations for ACY to the Port Authority of New York and New Jersey. New Jersey Governor Chris Christie in March 2013 ordered a takeover of the airport's operations by the Port Authority of New York and New Jersey.

Accidents and incidents
On July 26, 1969, TWA Flight 5787, a Boeing 707 operating as a training flight, crashed while performing a practice missed approach with an engine out on runway 13.  All five crew members aboard were killed.  The NTSB subsequently attributed the cause of the accident to be poor procedures for simulating engine failures and failure to apply the correct procedure for hydraulic failure, as well as loss of hydraulic power to the rudder in a critical flight condition.

On October 2, 2021, Spirit Airlines Flight 3044, an Airbus A320neo, suffered a birdstrike on takeoff, resulting in the right engine catching on fire. After performing a successful takeoff rejection, the plane was evacuated safely, with only two minor injuries reported between the 102 passengers and seven crew members.

References

External links

 
 
 

Airports in New Jersey
Transportation buildings and structures in Atlantic County, New Jersey
Egg Harbor Township, New Jersey
Galloway Township, New Jersey
Hamilton Township, Atlantic County, New Jersey
Airports established in 1942
1942 establishments in New Jersey